Acacia leptoclada, known colloquially as sharp feather wattle, and Tingha (golden) wattle, is a species of Acacia native to northern New South Wales in eastern Australia.

References

leptoclada
Fabales of Australia
Flora of New South Wales